Desislava Nikolova (born 21 December 1991) is a Bulgarian female volleyball player. She is a member of the Bulgaria women's national volleyball team and played for VK Maritsa Plovdiv  in 2017.

She was part of the Bulgarian national team at the 2015 FIVB World Grand Prix.

Clubs

References

External links 
 Player info, FIVB
 
 
 Interview Desislava Nikolova - November 11, 2017, Maritza Plovdiv VC

1985 births
Living people
Bulgarian women's volleyball players
Place of birth missing (living people)
Liberos
Expatriate volleyball players in Austria
Expatriate volleyball players in Italy
Expatriate volleyball players in Turkey
Bulgarian expatriates in Austria
Bulgarian expatriates in Italy
Bulgarian expatriate sportspeople in Turkey